A. J. Stasny Music Co. was an American publisher of popular sheet music. The firm was chartered as a New York corporation in 1922 by Betty "Bessie" Stastny (née Fisher) (1882–1974) and her husband, Anthony John Stastny (1885–1923), and M. Kerr – although, there was music published from as early as 1908 bearing the name A. J. Stasny Music Co. Cleveland, Ohio.  A. J. Stasny and his wife had moved from Cleveland to New York in 1910.  The New York firm was based out of the Tin Pan Alley district of Manhattan, New York.  By 1920, the firm had grown into one of the largest music publishing companies in the country with branch offices in 18 large cities, including Philadelphia, Chicago, San Francisco, and London – with over 200 employees and grossing over one million dollars a year.

The company is currently privately held by an heir, Eleanor Fisher — 29 Green Grove Avenue, Keyport, New Jersey.

Selected hits 
Anthony J. Stastny Music Co., Cleveland
 "Thurston: March & Two Step," by Anthony J. Stastny (1911) 
 "That's Some Kiss," words by M. Wolfe, music by E. Wagner (1912) Library of Congress: Historic Sheet Music Collection, 1800–1922
 "If You But Only Loved Me, Dear," words & music by Marion T. Bohannon (1909)

A. J. Stasny Music Co., New York

 "Down Where the Tennessee Flows," words by Ray Sherwood, music by Bert L. Rule (1913) 
 "I Did It All For You," words by Ray Sherwood, music by Bert L. Rule (1914) 
 "I'm Goin Back to Old Nebraska," words by Ray Sherwood, music by Bert L. Rule (1914) 
 "There's a Girl That's Meant for Me: in the Heart of Tennessee," words by Ray Sherwood, music by Bert L. Rule (1914) 
 "Why Shouldn't I Love You," words by Ray Sherwood, music by Bert L. Rule (1915) 
 "I Found You Among the Roses," words and music by George B. Pitman (1915) 
 "Mr. Ford You've Got the Right Idea," words by Ray Sherwood, music by J. Fred'k Coots (1916) 
 "When I Dream Of The Girl Of My Dreams," words by Ray Sherwood, music by J. Fred'k Coots (1916)
 "When Yankee Doodle Learns to 'parlez vous Français,'" words by Will. Hart, music by Edward G. Nelson (1917) 
 "When We Reach That Old Port Somewhere in France," words by Al Selden, music by Sam H. Stept, cover illustration by Strauss, Peyton, Albert Barbelle (1917) 
 "It's Never Too Late to be Sorry," words by James E. Dempsey, music by Joseph A. Burke (1918) 
 "A Soldier's Rosary," words by James E. Dempsey, music by Joseph A. Burke (1918) 
 "Welcome Home," words, by Bud Green, music by Ed. G. Nelson (1918) 
 "Rose Dreams," poem by J. R. Shannon, music by A. J. Stasny (1918)   
 "Girl of Mine," words and music by Harold Freeman (previously copyrighted by H. Federoff, 1917) (1919)  
 "I'm Not Jealous: But I Just Don't Like It," words by Harry Pease, music by Ed. G. Nelson & Fred Mayo (1919) 
 "Evening: Brings Love Dreams of You," words by Haven Gillespie, music by Earl Burtnett (1919) 
 "Oh! How I Miss You Mammy," words by Max C. Freedman, music by Harry D. Squires (1920) 
 "My Day Will Come When Your Day's Gone," by Monte Carlo and Alma Sanders (1924)

Company personnel 
 Tom Houston – Philadelphia office
 Earl Burtnett – San Francisco office
 Miss M. Kurz

References 

Stasny
Publishing companies established in 1922